The 2010 FIFA World Cup opening ceremony took place on 11 June at the Soccer City stadium in Johannesburg, two hours before the opening match of the tournament. The ceremony started at 2pm local time and lasted 40 minutes. The ceremony involved 1500 performers, including Thandiswa Mazwai, Timothy Moloi, Hugh Masekela, Khaled, Femi Kuti, Osibisa, R. Kelly, TKZee, Hip Hop Pantsula and the Soweto Gospel Choir.

Notable attendees
Although in frail health and 91 years old, the former South African president Nelson Mandela was scheduled to attend the opening ceremony, however had pulled out after the death of his great-granddaughter, who was killed in a car crash earlier in the day. A pre-recorded message appeared on the stadium screens instead.

Dignitaries from 4 organizations and 24 countries attended the event, which included 20 heads of state and 18 eminent persons. Alongside the FIFA President Sepp Blatter and the then South African president Jacob Zuma, other delegates included the South African religious leader Desmond Tutu, the United Nations secretary-general Ban Ki-moon, the Mexican president Felipe Calderón, Prince Albert of Monaco.

Guests
Official guests included :
 Ban Ki-moon, Secretary General of the United Nations
 Jean Ping, Chairperson of the African Union Commission
 Sepp Blatter, President of FIFA
 Thomas Bach, Vice President of International Olympic Committee
 Jacob Zuma, President of South Africa
 Felipe Calderon, President of Mexico
 Joe Biden, Vice President of the United States
 Evo Morales, President of Bolivia
 Federico Franco, Vice President of Paraguay
 Jose Eduardo dos Santos, President of Angola
 Viktor Orban, Prime Minister of Hungary
 Albert II, Sovereign Prince of Monaco
 Laurent Gbagbo, President of Ivory Coast
 Armando Guebuza, President of Mozambique
 Mohamed Abdelaziz, President of Sahrawi Republic
 Bakri Hassan Salih, Vice President of Sudan
 Denis Sassou Nguesso, President of Congo
 Joseph Kabila, President of Democratic Republic of the Congo 
 Saad Hariri, Prime Minister of Lebanon
 Letsie III, King of Lesotho
 Ali Bongo Ondimba, President of Gabon
 Robert Mugabe, President of Zimbabwe
 John Atta Mills, President of Ghana
 Mwai Kibaki, President of Kenya
 Abdelaziz Bouteflika, President of Algeria
 Goodluck Jonathan, President of Nigeria
 Paul Biya, President of Cameroon
 Meles Zenawi, Prime Minister of Ethiopia

Attended as eminent persons included :
Kofi Annan, former Secretary General of the United Nations
Alpha Oumar Konare, former Chairperson of the African Union Commission
Kenneth Kaunda, former President of Zambia
Morgan Tsvangirai, Prime Minister of Zimbabwe
Raila Odinga, Prime Minister of Kenya
Desmond Tutu, Religious leader of South Africa

Opening celebration concert
 
One day prior to the ceremony, the first-ever FIFA World Cup Kick-Off Celebration Concert took place on 10 June at Orlando Stadium in Soweto. Warm-up acts including Goldfish, 340ml and Tumi Molekane performed before the internationally televised portion of the concert began at 20:00 SAST. The three-hour main event included performances by Alicia Keys, Amadou & Mariam, Angelique Kidjo, The Black Eyed Peas, BLK JKS, The Dave Matthews Band, Freshlyground, Hugh Masekela, Juanes, K'Naan, Lira, Shakira, The Parlotones, Tinariwen, Vieux Farka Touré and Vusi Mahlasela.

References

External links

Opening ceremony
2010
June 2010 sports events in Africa
Ceremonies in South Africa